This list of protein structure prediction software summarizes notable  used software tools in protein structure prediction, including homology modeling, protein threading, ab initio methods, secondary structure prediction, and transmembrane helix and signal peptide prediction.

Software list

Below is a list which separates programs according to the method used for structure prediction.

Homology modeling

Threading/fold recognition

Ab initio structure prediction

Secondary structure prediction

Detailed list of programs can be found at List of protein secondary structure prediction programs

See also
List of protein secondary structure prediction programs
Comparison of nucleic acid simulation software
List of software for molecular mechanics modeling
Molecular design software
Protein design

External link
bio.tools, finding more tools

References

Lists of software
Protein methods
Protein structure
Structural bioinformatics software
Proteomics